The 2019–20 Premier League Tournament was the 32nd season of first-class cricket in Sri Lanka's Premier Trophy. The tournament started on 31 January 2020 and was originally scheduled to conclude on 12 April 2020. Fourteen teams took part in the competition, split into two groups of seven. Sri Lanka Ports Authority Cricket Club were relegated at the end of the previous tournament, with Lankan Cricket Club replacing them in this tournament after they gained promotion from Tier B. Colombo Cricket Club were the defending champions.

On 16 March 2020, following the conclusion of the group stage fixtures, Sri Lanka Cricket postponed the rest of the tournament due to the COVID-19 pandemic. In July 2020, Sri Lanka Cricket announced that the tournament would resume on 14 July 2020, to allow for the completion of the Plate League and Super Eight rounds. However, the resumption was further delayed by the tournament committee, pending approval of the amended tournament rules and structure. After a further delay due to the 2020 Sri Lankan parliamentary elections, the tournament restarted on 10 August 2020.

Moors Sports Club won the Plate League, and Colombo Cricket Club retained their title, with an unassailable lead ahead of the final round of Super Eight matches. In the final round of matches, Dinesh Chandimal scored 354 not out, batting for Sri Lanka Army Sports Club. It was the highest first-class score in a domestic match in Sri Lanka, beating the previous record of 351 runs scored by Kithuruwan Vithanage.

Teams
The following teams competed:

Group A
 Burgher Recreation Club
 Colombo Cricket Club
 Colts Cricket Club
 Moors Sports Club
 Negombo Cricket Club
 Sinhalese Sports Club
 Sri Lanka Army Sports Club

Group B
 Badureliya Sports Club
 Chilaw Marians Cricket Club
 Lankan Cricket Club
 Nondescripts Cricket Club
 Ragama Cricket Club
 Saracens Sports Club
 Tamil Union Cricket and Athletic Club

Points table

Group A

 Team qualified for the Super Eight

Group B

 Team qualified for the Super Eight

Super Eight

 Champions

Plate League

 Relegated to Tier B

Group stage

Group A

Round 1

Round 2

Round 3

Round 4

Round 5

Round 6

Round 7

Group B

Round 1

Round 2

Round 3

Round 4

Round 5

Round 6

Round 7

Plate League

Super Eight

See also
 2019–20 Premier League Tournament Tier B

References

External links
 Series home at ESPN Cricinfo

Premier League Tournament
Premier League Tournament
Premier League Tournament